Emma Suárez Bodelón (born 25 June 1964) is a Spanish actress. She has won twice the Goya Award for Best Actress, namely for her performances in The Dog in the Manger (1996) and Julieta (2016).

Biography
Emma Suárez Bodelón was born on 25 June 1964 in Madrid. Raised in a family with no significant connection to acting, Suárez attended her first casting at age 14, making her debut performance in Memorias de Leticia Valle, in which she portrayed the title character. From age 15 to 25, she gained experience on stage, performing in plays such as El cementerio de los pájaros, Bajarse al moro and La chunga.

Selected filmography

Film

Television

Accolades

References

External links 
 

Spanish film actresses
Spanish stage actresses
Spanish television actresses
1964 births
Living people
Actresses from Madrid
Best Actress Goya Award winners
Best Supporting Actress Goya Award winners
20th-century Spanish actresses
21st-century Spanish actresses